Malvin Hunter (born November 20, 1969) is a former American and Canadian football linebacker and defensive end in the World League of American Football (WLAF) and Canadian Football League (CFL). He played in the WLAF for the San Antonio Riders and the CFL for the Edmonton Eskimos. He played college football at Wisconsin.

References

1969 births
Living people
People from Harvey, Illinois
Players of American football from Illinois
American football linebackers
American football defensive ends
Canadian football linebackers
Canadian football defensive linemen
Wisconsin Badgers football players
San Antonio Riders players
Edmonton Elks players